Nassella lepida (syn. Stipa lepida) is a species of grass known by the common names foothill needlegrass, foothills nassella, foothill stipa, small-flowered stipa, small-flowered needlegrass, and smallflower tussockgrass.

Distribution
It is native to California in the United States, where it occurs as far north as Humboldt County, and its range extends into Baja California.

Description
This is a perennial bunchgrass growing up to a meter tall. The flat or rolled leaf blades are up to 23 centimeters long. The panicle is up to 55 centimeters long and has branches bearing up to 6 spikelets each The spikelet has an awn up to 4.6 to 5.5 centimeters long.

This grass grows in chaparral and grassland habitat. It can also be found in coastal sage scrub and coastal prairie.

This species and several others were recently transferred from genus Stipa into Nassella, mainly on the basis of their "strongly convolute lemmas". Genetic evidence supports the transfer.

This species may hybridize with Nassella pulchra.

References

External links
 Calflora Database: Stipa lepida (foothill needle grass)
Jepson eFlora (TJM2): Stipa lepida
USDA Plants Profile for Nassella lepida (foothill needlegrass)
Stipa lepida — UC Photos gallery

lepida
Bunchgrasses of North America
Native grasses of California
Grasses of Mexico
Flora of Baja California
Flora of the Sierra Nevada (United States)
Natural history of the California chaparral and woodlands
Natural history of the California Coast Ranges
Natural history of the Peninsular Ranges
Natural history of the San Francisco Bay Area
Natural history of the Santa Monica Mountains
Natural history of the Transverse Ranges